Anders Olsen Jordahl (April 4, 1878 – February 18, 1969) was a Norwegian-American engineer,  inventor,  entrepreneur and artist.

Anders Olsen Jordahl was born at Elverum in Hedmark,  Norway. His parents were  Ole Jordahl and Mary (Furer) Jordahl. His father was a schoolteacher. His family was originally from the traditional district of Nordmøre.  In the first years of the new century, Jordahl met the young Swedish civil engineer Ivar Kreuger in the United States. They were both interested in reinforced concrete building design and construction, and worked for a few years in the building industry in the United States. After their work together, both returned to Europe to promote their modern ideas.

In 1907,  Ivar Kreuger acquired the European marketing rights for Kahneisen, a system for reinforced concrete construction invented by Julius Kahn during 1903.  In Germany, Jordahl and Kreuger, formed the company Deutsche Kahneisen Gesellschaft mbH (now Jordahl GmbH) in 1913. Through this company, Jordahl developed and patented an anchor channel for reinforced concrete buildings. He designed a C-shaped profile in 1913  which was moulded into walls and used as reinforcement and connection device at the same time.  This was the first anchor channel ever developed.  The patent for this invention was granted to Jordahl on December 11, 1913.

Kreuger had not only studied building design in America, but also the workings of the stock exchange. He returned to Sweden, and became a famous, (and later infamous) tycoon. For a short period the two friends ran a restaurant in South Africa. They continued a personal relation during following years until Kreuger's death in 1932.

In 1941, Jordahl moved to Millstone, New Jersey, where he died in 1969.

References

External links

Norwegian company founders
Norwegian engineers
Concrete pioneers
1878 births
1969 deaths
People from Millstone, New Jersey
Norwegian emigrants to the United States